Sadovoye is a rural locality (a selo) and administrative center of Sarpinsky District, Republic of Kalmykia, Russia. Population: .

References

Rural localities in Kalmykia
Sarpinsky District
Populated places established in 1849